Andy Roddick was the defending champion, but lost in the first round to Xavier Malisse. Jürgen Melzer defeated Milos Raonic in the final 7–5, 7–6(7–4).

Seeds

Draw

Finals

Top half

Bottom half

Qualifying

Seeds

Qualifiers

Draw

First qualifier

Second qualifier

Third qualifier

Fourth qualifier

References
 Main Draw
 Qualifying Draw

2012 ATP World Tour
Singles